The 1954 Lady Wigram Trophy was a motor race held at the Wigram Airfield Circuit on 6 February 1954. It was the third Lady Wigram Trophy to be held and was won by Peter Whitehead in the Ferrari 125, thereby becoming the first international driver to win the Lady Wigram Trophy.

Classification

References

Lady Wigram Trophy
Lady
February 1954 sports events in New Zealand